True Entertainment was a former British free-to-air television channel that was launched on 3 August 2009, replacing Showcase TV. The change was originally scheduled to happen on 1 July 2009, but a late change put the change "on hold until further notice". Whilst the bulk of its programming were movies, similar to sister channels True Movies 1 and True Movies 2, the channel aimed to establish itself as a general entertainment channel.

Its licence first appeared on the Ofcom website in January 2007 (initially named "Toon TV", this was changed to "AnimeCentral" in June 2007, to "True Entertainment" in June 2008, and to "Showcase TV" on 26 August 2008. It then changed back to "True Entertainment" on 10 June 2009. Its logo is the same as the True Movies 1 and True Movies 2.

On 5 July 2010, True Entertainment was launched on Freesat. On 1 March 2011, True Entertainment launched on Virgin Media. True Entertainment was launched on Freeview channel 61, with the exception of transmitters in Wales, on 6 August 2013. It was accompanied by a refreshed schedule to take into account the new Freeview viewers. A temporary duplicate launched on channel 126 on Virgin Media at midnight on 22 July 2018, a slot previously vacated by Alibi prior to the UKTV channels' removals, until the network was restored on 11 August 2018.

True Entertainment +1, a one-hour timeshift channel, was launched on 25 February 2013. The channel was replaced by True Drama on 4 June 2013. The channel relaunched on 3 April 2014, replacing BuzMuzik, which closed due to CSC bringing Starz TV to their list. It closed again on 17 August 2015, with its slot being bought by the Information TV group for Showcase, which moved from channel 192, as its slot was bought by BT Group for their AMC from BT channel. On 30 September 2016, it returned, replacing True Drama. The channel was launched on Virgin Media on 21 July 2018.

On 24 July 2019, it was announced that the channel would be closed and will be replaced by the relaunch of Sony Channel from 10 September 2019.

Former Programming
 Born and Bred
 Chicago Hope
 Due South
 Gunsmoke
 Hamish Macbeth 
 Happy Days
 Highway to Heaven
 Little House on the Prairie
 Ironside
 M*A*S*H
 Murder, She Wrote
 Napoleon and Josephine 
 The New Avengers
 Pearl
 The Persuaders!
 Providence
 The Prisoner
 Randall and Hopkirk (Deceased)
 Road to Avonlea
 Roots
 Taggart
 Tenko
 Touched by an Angel
 The Vice
 The Waltons

References

External links

CSC Media Group
English-language television stations in the United Kingdom
Sony Pictures Television
Television channels and stations established in 2009
Television channels and stations disestablished in 2019